Cruciloculina is a genus of foraminifers included in the Miliolidae from the Neogene, closely resembling Triloculina

The test is free, chambers one-half coil in length, added in planes 120 deg. apart, as in Triloculina. Tests are rounded to triangular in section; sutures depressed.  As with other miliolid, the wall of the test is composed in imperforate, porcelaneous calcite. The aperture is terminal, at the end of the final chamber, but instead of having a distinct tooth, as in Triloculina, Cruciloculina develops as tri-radiate aperture in the young that becomes cruciform (X-shaped) to dendritic in the adult.
Derivation from Triloculina is apparent.

Cruciloculina is known from the North Atlantic and South Atlantic Oceans and from Japan. Recent species have been found, for example, near the Falkland and South Georgia Islands.

References 

 Alfred R. Loeblich Jr and Helen Tappan, 1964. Sarcodina Chiefly "Thecamoebians" and Foraminiferida; Treatise on Invertebrate Paleontology, Part C Protista 2. Geological Society of America and University of Kansas Press.

Tubothalamea
Foraminifera genera
Extant Pliocene first appearances